Snowdon is a neighbourhood located in Montreal, Quebec, Canada. It is part of the Côte-des-Neiges–Notre-Dame-de-Grâce borough. The area is centred on the intersection of the Décarie Expressway and Queen Mary Road.

Snowdon is bordered by Macdonald Street (Hampstead) in the west, Victoria Avenue (Côte-des-Neiges) in the east, Côte-Saint-Luc Road (Notre-Dame-de-Grâce) to the south and Vézina Street and the railway tracks (Le Triangle) to the north. Furthermore, the northwest end borders Côte Saint-Luc and the southeast end borders Westmount.

The neighbourhood is served by the Snowdon Metro, which has access to the Metro's Orange Line and Blue Line, and by Côte-Sainte-Catherine and Plamondon stations on the Orange Line. Notable buildings in the neighbourhood include the former Snowdon Theatre.

The district was named for James Snowdon, who owned a farm where the neighbourhood now stands.

References

Neighbourhoods in Montreal
Côte-des-Neiges–Notre-Dame-de-Grâce
Jewish communities in Canada
Jews and Judaism in Montreal